Glipostenoda ferruginea is a species of beetle in the genus Glipostenoda. It was described in 1995.

References

ferruginea
Beetles described in 1995